Djupvik is a surname. Notable people with the surname include:

Anlaug Amanda Djupvik, Norwegian astronomer
Anton Djupvik (1881–1951), Norwegian politician
Morten Djupvik (born 1972), Norwegian show jumper
Olav Djupvik (1931–2016), Norwegian politician
Roger Aa Djupvik (born 1981), Norwegian cross-country skier